Ekaj is a 2015 American independent drama film written and directed by Cati Gonzalez, starring Jake Mestre, Badd Idea, and Scooter LaForge. The film made its New York City premiere at the 5th Annual International Puerto Rican Heritage Film Festival.

Gonzalez intended for Ekaj to be a work in the vein of Midnight Cowboy, but with a focus on New York's Puerto Rican drifters. The film screened at several Film Festivals which include, LesGaiCineMad, Palm Beach International Film Festival, Q Fest St. Louis / St. Louis International Film Festival, QCinema Fort Worth, Downtown Urban Arts Festival, NewFilmmakers NY, SF Latino Film Festival Cine+Mas, International Film Festival, Idyllwild International Festival of Cinema, Macabre Faire Film Festival, Human Rights Film Festival Barcelona and other festivals worldwide.

Plot 
Ekaj is a naïve runaway teen who tries to survive in New York City. He meets "Mecca" (Badd Idea), a cynical artist and hustler who takes Ekaj under his care. Mecca stays at his cousins place and we get glimpses of the fact that he has AIDS, since he has tattoos with the word written on his body. He drinks all day but still manages to be sane and sharp. He's also an opportunistic thief. Ekaj decides to go into prostitution out of desperation. Mecca becomes ill, as his medication does not really seem to be working for him. At the same time we see Ekaj becoming stronger and less vulnerable. He ends up falling in love with a painter named "Johnny" (Scooter LaForge) who has no tolerance and is constantly beating him. Johnny seems indifferent and cold towards Ekaj's desperate love and obsession for him. With no place to really sleep, Ekaj stays during the day with Mecca at his cousin's place, at Johnny's place, or at times staying in hotel rooms paid by coins (clients). Their relationship develops into true love and care for each other.

Cast 

 Jake Mestre
 Badd Idea
 Scooter LaForge
 Vinny Cruz 
 Mario Piantini
 Carlos Anaya 
 Prince Franco 
 Joey Lopez
 Johnny King
 Maximilian France  
 William Lynn
 Nita Aviance
 Clifton Brown Jr. 
 Gage of the Boone
 Rashid Henderson  
 Superok Gachineiro
 Giovanie Paz

Reception 
The film had a very successful Film Festival run in the year 2016. It won its first award for "Best Film" at the 2016 NY Downtown Urban Arts Festival in Tribeca, New York City, where it was well received by a sold-out audience. Ekaj ended up becoming a hit at festivals and continued to screen worldwide from the years 2017, 2018 until early January 2019 when it had its most recent screening at the Dona i Cinema (Women in Film) Festival in Valencia, Spain. The overall response to the film since being released online via Video on Demand by distributor Indie Rights has been largely positive.

Ekaj currently holds a 100% critic approval rating on the online review aggregator Rotten Tomatoes based on 16 reviews.

Accolades

 2016 NY Downtown Urban Arts Film Festival – Best Film
 2016 Philadelphia Independent Film Festival – Best Film, Best New-Director, Best Actor
 2016 Pembroke Taparelli Arts and Film Festival – Best Film
 2016 QCinema Fort Worth Film Festival – Best First Film
 2016 I Filmmaker International Film Festival, Spain – Special Mention
 2017 Macabre Faire Film Festival – Best Director
 2017 Idyllwild International Festival of Cinema – Best Cinematography
 2017 Trans* Film Festival Kiel, Germany – Best Film, Best Actor, Best Music Soundtrack
 2017 Premios Latino, Spain – Best Film, Best Cinematography
 2017 Boom Film Awards, USA – Best Film, Best Supporting Actor
 2017 Festival de Cine de Marbella, Spain – Best Film (Blogos de Oro Critics Award), Best Director
 2017 Nuevo Cine Andaluz de Casares, Spain – Best Director
 2017 Mediterranean Film Festival Cannes, France – Special Mention
 2017 Amarcord Chicago Arthouse & TV Video Awards, USA – Best Screenplay
 2018 Ibiza Cine Fest, Spain – Best Film
 2018 Global Motion Picture Awards, USA – Best Film, Best Editing
 2018 Sicily International Film Festival, Italy – Best Film
 2018 Hudson Yard Film Festival, USA  – Best Film, Best Director
 2016 Newark International Film Festival, USA  – Best Director, Best Actor – Nominated
 2016 International Film Festival Manhattan, USA – Best Actor – Nominated
 2016 Chicago BLOW-UP ArtHouse Film Festival, USA – Best Film – Nominated
 2017 Macabre Faire Film Festival, USA – Nominations (5)
 2016 I Filmmaker International Film Festival, Spain – Best Film – Nominated
 2017 2017 Idyllwild International Festival of Cinema – Nominated (7)
 2017 Trans* Film Festival Kiel, Germany – Best Song, Best Poster – Nominated
 2017 Alternative Film Festival, Toronto, Canada – Best Poster – Nominated

Further reading
 "Director hopes to shine light on struggles of homeless lgbt kids in NYC" – DNAinfo
 "A groundbreaking exposé of the issues homeless LGBTQ youth face, beautifully told through masterful story crafting" – Huffington Post
 "Film Programmers Top 5 Latino Movies of 2016"] – Remezcla
 "A Saipan Filmmakers Perspective GIFF 2016" – Marianna's Variety
 "6th Guam Intl. Film Festival Kicks off" – The Guam Post
 "EKAJ: A Sweet Film That Proves To Be Teflon-Tough" – A&U Magazine
 "The Women's Texas Film Festival Returns in August" – D Magazine
 "Festival Puts Focus on Films by Women" – The Dallas Morning News
 "Sex Workers Define Themselves in Long Running Arts and Cultural Festival" – PR Web
 "Lights! Camera! QFest!" – BOOM
 "CinePalium Fest, quarto giorno dedicato al grande cinema" – daBitonto
 "CinePalium Fest, il programma completo" – PaloLive.it
 "Palo del Colle e il cinema internazionale: il programma completo del Cinepalium fest" – Pale del Colle
 "Criticas De Kater, Ekaj..." – Dos Manzanas
 "El Festival de Cinema i Drets Humans denuncia las injusticias en el mundo" – El Periódico
 "Lo que no te puedes perder de la Bienal Internacional Dona i Cinema" – Valencia Plaza
 "4º Festival de cine y televisión Reino de León" – León Cultural
 "Festival Cine y TV Reino de León selecciona 94 trabajos de 700 presentados" – La Vanguardia
 "El Festival Nuevo Cine Andaluz de Casares premia a la película "Fogueo" y a la directora Cati González" – Estepona Press
 "El certamen de la localidad malagueña de Casares otorga galardones a "Ekaj", "Samba. Un nombre borrado", "Omega" y "Resort Paraíso" – Fundación Audiovisual de Andalucía
 "El IbizaCineFest no quiere ser glamuroso sino alternativo" – Diario de Ibiza
 "21 países muestran su diversidad en festival de cine gay" – El Telégrafo
 "Festival Marbella estrenará cinta de Depardieu y premiará a Carlos Bardem" – La Vanguardia
 "Festival Marbella estrenará cinta de Depardieu y premiará a Carlos Bardem" – Diario SUR
 "Cinco óperas primas competirán en la Sección Oficial del Festival de Cine de Marbella" – La Tribuna Hoy – Andalucía
 "El Festival de Cine de Marbella extiende la alfombra roja en Puerto Banús" – La Opinion de Málaga
 "Marbella potencia su promoción turística con un festival de cine" – Agro Magazine
 "Certámenes: Premio para "Vico C" en Puerto Rico, "Alba"y "Quijotes Negros" en Ecuador y "Anomalous" en España" – NotiCine
 "El Festival de Cine de Marbella levanta el telón arropado por el público y la industria" – Málaga Hoy
 "La hostelería local y los centros escolares se vuelcan con la quinta edición de Santurzine" – El Correo
 "Cineteca Zacatecas: estrenos" – Zacateca Online
 "6ο Thessaloniki Pride" – ThessOut
 "It's reminiscent of an early film by the Safdie brothers but still manages to create its own place among the subgenre" – Film Threat
 "EKAJ: A Young Story That Needs to Grow" – Film Inquiry
 "A film that has the potential to make the unaware, aware" – The Voice of London
 "Gonzalez's aesthetic falls between Larry Clark and Gus Van Sant" – State of The Arts
 "An important, UNMISSABLE film, for fans of Larry Clark's "Kids" and much more raw-er than Sean Baker's "Tangerine" – No Gloss Film Festival

References

External links

 
 

2015 films
Gay-related films
American independent films
American LGBT-related films
American drama films
HIV/AIDS in American films
2010s American films